Gagik Shmavonyan (Armenian: Գագիկ Շմավոնյան, May 12, 1963) is Professor at National Polytechnic University of Armenia, PhD in physics, D.Sc. in Engineering., Chief Scientific Coordinator of International multidisciplinary group of External Experts from different countries at Electronic Mechanic Technician Associates (ELMT) (Switzerland) in collaboration with UMS Skeldar (Sweden), Advisor at Ministry of High-Tech Industry of Armenia, Expert at Malta Council for Science and Technology, Science Fund of the Republic of Serbia, Cyprus Research Promotion Foundation, European Cooperation in Science and Technology (EU COST) and Science Committee of Armenia, as well as President of NanoHiTech Association (Nanotechnology).

Education 
He got his PhD in physics in 1996 and D.Sc in Engineering in 2009 at National Polytechnic University of Armenia. He did postdoc at National Taiwan University (2001–2002). He was an Invited/Visiting Professor/Scholar at the University of Hull, UK (2000, 2003), Polytechnic of Milan, Como, Italy (2004–2005), University of Bremen, Germany (2002, 2006), Free University Berlin, Germany (2011), Trinity College Dublin, CRANN, Ireland (2012), University of Santiago de Compostela, Spain (2013–2014), Institute of Nanoscience and Nanotechnology, National Center for Scientific Research "Demokritos", Athens, Greece (2017), University of Cergy-Pontoise, France (2016, 2017), Eberhard Karls University of Tübingen, Germany (2019).

Research interests 
 2D atomic materials (graphene, etc.), smart materials, 2D hybrid atomic structures,
 2D atomic devices, 2D flexible electronics,
 Nanostructured optoelectronic devices: photoelectrochemical, photovoltaic and thermophotovoltaic cells, perovskite solar cells, semiconductor lasers and semiconductor optical amplifiers, etc.

Selected publications 
 Shmavonyan G.Sh. Monograph Chapter Graphene and two-dimensional atomic materials and their hybrid structures in the 3 Volume Textbook Optical Nanospectroscopy, Vol. 1: Fundamentals, Vol. 2: Methods, Vol. 3: Applications, McMillan N., Sheremet E., Fleischer M. (Eds.), Publisher De Gruyter, 2021 (in English) (in press).
Shmavonyan G.Sh., Vázquez Vázquez C., López-Quintela M.A. Single-step rubbing method for mass production of large-size and defect-free two-dimensional material nanostripes, films and hybrid nanostructures on any substrate, Transl. Mater. Res., IOP Publishing, 4 (2), 025001, 2017.
 Shmavonyan G.Sh. Monograph Semiconductor nanostrucured optolectronic devices, “Engineer” press, Khachatryan N.A. (Eds.), Yerevan, Armenia, 250 p., 2017 (in Armenian), 2019.
 Petrosyan O.H., Shmavonyan G.Sh., Vardanyan A.A. Nanoelectronic elements and devices, Academic manual, “Engineer” press, Khachatryan N.A. (Eds.), Yerevan, Armenia, 326 p., 2019 (in Armenian).
 Shmavonyan G.Sh. Basics of Nanotechnologies, Academic manual, “Engineer” press, Khachatryan N.A. (Eds.), Yerevan, Armenia, 224 p., 2011 (in Armenian), .
 Ispiryan N.P., Shmavonyan G.Sh. Physics of Semiconductors, Problem book, “Engineer” press, Khachatryan N.A. (Eds.), Yerevan, Armenia, 111 p., 2010 (in Armenian), .
 Buniatyan V.V., Shmavonyan G.Sh., Martirosyan N.V. Investigation methods of electronic and opto¬elec¬tro¬nic solid state materials and structures, Academic manual, “Engineer” press, Khachatryan N.A. (Eds.), Yerevan, Armenia, 418 p., 2005 (in Armenian).

References

External links 
 Google Scholar
gagikshmavonyan.am
Armenian Public TV
CA15107 Multicomp Autumn Meeting in Bucharest

Nanotechnologists
Materials scientists and engineers
Engineers from Yerevan
Optoelectronics
1963 births
Living people